Aleš Kněžínek, better known by his in-game name Freeze, is a Czech former professional League of Legends player and current Assistant Coach for 100 Thieves. He has also played for Renegades, H2k-Gaming, Copenhagen Wolves, and Ninjas in Pyjamas. He was the first Czech national to play in the LCS.

Career 
With Ninjas in Pyjamas, Kněžížek Began his LCS career beginning in the summer split of season 3. By the end of the split, the team finished the regular season in 5th place, making it to the playoffs, where they finished 6th overall. This, unfortunately, lead Ninjas in Pyjamas to be relegated to the challenger series, where Kněžížek would stay for all of season 4, before later leaving the disbanding NiP. Kněžížek was then picked up by the Copenhagen Wolves before beginning the season 5 spring split, where he and the team finished 6th. In the summer split of season 5, the Copenhagen Wolves were much less successful, finishing in last place, 10th, forcing them to be auto-relegated. And once Kněžížek's contract expired and he announced his free agency on November 1, 2015. He was picked up by North American team Renegades on January 6, where he is currently playing the season 6 spring split. Renagades finished 8th in the LCS, and Kněžížek left the team after the disappointing finish.

He joined H2k on May 8, 2016, ahead of the EU LCS Summer 2016 split, replacing FORG1VEN at AD Carry as the latter was conscripted into the Greek Army. However, FORG1VEN later had his military service commuted, and transferred to Origen.

On July 27, 2016, H2k announced that Kněžížek would step away from the roster due to persistent tendonitis. The team stated that FORG1VEN would take his place on the starting roster. Signed by Tempo Storm in December 2016.

In 2020, Kněžížek stepped away from competitive play and signed with 100 Thieves as an assistant coach.

Tournament results

2013

2014

Ninjas in Pyjamas 
 1st — DreamHack Summer 2014 (17 June 2014)

Copenhagen Wolves 
 6th — 2015 Spring EU LCS
 10th — 2015 Summer EU LCS

Renagades 
 8th — 2016 Spring NA LCS

H2k-Gaming 
 4th — 2016 Summer EU LCS

Notes

References

Living people
H2k-Gaming players
Renegades (esports) players
Copenhagen Wolves players
Ninjas in Pyjamas players
Tempo Storm players
Czech esports players
League of Legends AD Carry players
1990s births
League of Legends coaches